Never Touched Me is a 1919 American short comedy film featuring Harold Lloyd. A print exists in the Staatliches Filmarchive.

Plot
Harold is one of several suitors attempting to woo Bebe.  Several fights break out among the hopefuls at Bebe's home.  Eventually she and Harold leave quickly on foot while being hotly pursued by the rest.  Bebe leads Harold into a cafe where she is a dancer billed as "The Princess of Sapphire".  Harold is mistaken as an orchestra leader and comically leads the band in a tune, all the while trying to avoid being struck by a trombonist's instrument .  The most belligerent of Harold's rivals eventually puts him is a violent choke hold after he sees Harold come out of Bebe's dressing room.  Harold is rescued by the police who inform him that the suitor who was choking him was a wanted man.

Cast
 Harold Lloyd 
 Snub Pollard 
 Bebe Daniels  
 Sammy Brooks
 Lige Conley (as Lige Cromley)
 Billy Fay
 Lew Harvey
 Wallace Howe
 James T. Kelley
 Noah Young

See also
 Harold Lloyd filmography

References

External links

Never Touched Me at SilentEra

1919 films
1919 short films
American silent short films
1919 comedy films
American black-and-white films
Films directed by Alfred J. Goulding
Silent American comedy films
American comedy short films
1910s American films